Vrata is a Sanskrit word that means "vow, resolve, devotion", and refers to pious observances such as fasting and pilgrimage (Tirtha) found in Indian religions such as Jainism and Hinduism. It is typically accompanied with prayers seeking health and happiness for their loved ones.

Etymology
Vrata (Sanskrit: व्रत) means "vow, resolve, devotion", and refers to the practice of austerity, particularly in matters related to foods and drinks by people in Hindu and Jaina culture, as part of a pious observance or prayers seeking health, fertility, long life or happiness for her loved ones.

Derived from the root ‘vr’ ("will, rule, restrain, conduct, choose, select"), the word is found over 200 times in the Rigveda. It is also found in other Vedic literature including the Upanishads, but the context suggests that the meaning of the word in the Vedic era was not as a personal pious observance, and instead was related to ṛta and dharma, in the sense of inner principles and universal laws that keep order in the cosmos. Every man's vocation, as in hymn 9.112.1 of the Rigveda, is called his Vrata. Thus, whatever profession one is devoted to, resolves to do his best in, is deemed Vrata in the Vedic literature. The act of sacrifice, in another context such as in hymn 1.93.8 of the Rigveda, is also called a Vrata.

The post-Vedic texts use the term as a form of self-imposed restrictions on food and behavior, sometimes with a vow. The concept evolves as a form of religious votive rite, personalized and interiorized, one that does not need a public ceremony or a private one, but that is privately observed. Its meaning retains a sense of personal sacrifice (fast, or restricted diet), in exchange for hope, accompanied with a prayer to a personally defined or cherished divinity, and propelled by the wish for the well being of one's loved ones. The Grihya-sutras (domestic life manuals), the Puranas and the epics describe the practice particularly in the context of Vedic students, brahmins, and women, as "devotion, solemn vow, holy practice, resolve, dedication".

Hinduism 

Vrata is a religious votive rite, a vow often involving abstinence from food, particularly common with women. It may be accompanied with elaborate prayers, other rites such as charity or visit to a temple, sometimes observed during festivals or with sanskara (rite of passage) ceremonies. It is found in ancient Hindu texts such as the Vedas, but in a fluid context that is not in the sense of pious observances.

The Hindu Upanishads conceptualize Vrata as an ethical and behavioral discipline process, one where food is respected, the needy helped, the stranger welcomed, the student carries on the pursuit of knowledge. The Puranas link the practice to the empowering concept of Shakti of a woman, while the Dharmasastras link the practice to one possible form of penance through the concept of Prāyaścitta for both men and women.

A vrata is a personal practice, typically involves no priest, but may involve personal prayer, chanting, reading of spiritual texts, social get together of friends and family, or silent meditation.

Reasons
A Vrata may be motivated by many factors and is observed by both genders, but far more often by women. The most common are temporal wishes, such as the speedy recovery of a sick child, success or happiness for a loved one, fertility, ward off negativity or dangers, make prayers and good wishes for someone departing for a distant place. In the case of women, the prayers are usually on behalf of brother(s), children or husband, but sometimes for her own prosperity, mind-body balance and health.

Sociologists who have interviewed women who observe Vrata report that the practice is explained, according to Anne Pearson, as something that gives "peace of mind", that she has made an effort to the best of her abilities and out of duty towards those important to her in her life, she has a sense of contentment in her heart and intellect, and thus she feels she has achieved something. It is also an expression of care and love, a reminder of ethical principles of the Hindu traditions.

A Vrata is sometimes a result of voluntary vow or part of practice by a brahmacharya (student) or grihastha (householders) that they feel as obligatory before or during certain spiritual or religious practice. Utsavas, or religious festivals, share some elements with vratas, incorporating the practice of restraining food and similar austerity, as a part of the festive observance. Some Vrats are for religious (dharma) or soteriological goals (moksha), some are for nonreligious reasons, some celebration of one's cultural tradition, and others are a form of quid pro quo sacrifice to get or give divine help to someone.

Another reason for observing Vratas is the belief that they are a form of sorry, self-correction, penance and expiatory (prāyaścitta). Vratas are discussed as a means to prāyaścitta in Dharmasastra texts. Many prāyaścitta vratas in these texts suggest it include the feeding of "Brahmins, blind, poor and helpless", as well as other acts of charity. However, a Vrata can consist of many different activities. Other examples of Vrata activity include fasting, burning incense sticks, prayers before a deity, meditating and such activities. The śmrtis go into great detail on the subject of vratas, discussing even the details pertaining to what type of flowers should be used in worship.

Men and women, state the Dharmashastras and the Puranas, can expiate their sins through the use of vratas. For prāyaścitta, the Vratas are the second most discussed method in the Puranas, after the Tirtha.

Observances and practices

A Vrata is observed either as an independent private ritual at a date of one's choice, as part of a particular ceremony such as wedding, or as a part of a major festival such as Diwali (Lakshmi, festival of lights), Shivaratri (Shiva), Navratri (Durga or Rama), Ekadashi (Krishna, Vishnu avatars).

A typical Vrata involves a fast for a fixed period of time, usually a full day, where either no food is eaten, or only one meal is eaten in the entire day, or only a certain food such as milk is consumed during the period of the Vrata. Other observances include sleeping on the ground or a short sleep, or alternatively yoga with meditation, reading scripture and charitable giving (dāna).

Some Vratas are more elaborate, such as those associated with major festivals or tirtha or rite of passage ceremonies, involving weeks of preparation, the drawing of Vrata mandala from various colored grain flour, wall decoration, cleaning of the house, special bath and festive dress, charity, a visit to a Hindu temple for a darśana of the inner sanctum or puja within one's home. In Nepal, Hindus visit Pashupatinatha temple for example, families light lamps on Balacaturdasi on a winter night and then set them afloat in Bagamati river next morning, followed by strewing grains for birds. Kane lists hundreds of Vrata found in Hindu texts.

Types
The puranas denote various types of vratas, such as,
‘kayika-vrata’. It is a vrata pertaining to the body. The stress is on physical austerity like fasting.
‘vachika-vrata’ or vrata pertaining to speech. Here much importance is given to speaking the truth and reciting the scriptures.
‘manasa-vrata’ or vrata pertaining to the mind. The emphasis here is on controlling the mind, by controlling the passions and prejudices that arise in it.

A vrata may also be classified by its time period, such as Vrata for a day is a dina-vrata,  a paksha (week or fortnight) is a vaara-vrata or a paksha-vrata.

Nirjala-vrata (nirjal vrat) 
It consists of complete fasting without drinking water. Hence, it is called Nirjala(Without water or waterless) vrata. Unlike normal(common) vratas in which consumption of fruits, juices, milk, water and sugar is allowed, the 'vrati' doesn't eat or drink anything at all (to purify their body). It is common in Hindu festivals such as Nirjala Ekadashi, and chhath.

Jainism 

Five vrata-s (vows) are one of the codes of conduct for Jain householders. Any of the vows (vratas) that govern the activities of both monks and laymen. These are similar to the Yamas of yoga, and include the vow of ahimsa, satya, asteya, brahmacharya and aparigraha. Jainism also has seven supplementary vows, called the Shila-vratas, which suggest additional virtues.

Fasting is part of vrata observances in Jainism, and some involve congregational fasting at temples. Vrata among Jaina women may involve complete or partial fasting on certain specific days; a pilgrimage or tirtha to a particular place or places, as well as virtuous actions to others. Vrata is viewed as a form of austerity, with the power to remove karma from jiva (soul) and gain punya (merit).

Laypersons aren't expected to observe these vows strictly. Once a layperson has gone through the preliminary stages of spiritual discipline (gunasthana), that person may promise to observe 12 vows for a stated period of time and may renew the pledge at the completion of that time.

See also
 Jaya Parvati vrat
 Vow of silence
 Novena
 Tapas (Indian religions)
 Tapas (Jain religion)

References

Bibliography

 

 Dictionary of Hindu Lore and Legend by Anna Dallapiccola
 Vrata: Sacred Vows and Traditional Fasts, by M.N. Dutt. Cosmo Publication, 2003.